The Casa de Cervantes ("Cervantes' House") is a museum located in the city of Valladolid, Spain. The building was the home of the Spanish author Miguel de Cervantes. It is not to be confused with other houses associated with Cervantes, the birthplace in Alcala de Henares and the museum in Esquivias.

Overview
Valladolid is where the Spanish Court was briefly, from 1601 to 1606, the last time it left Madrid. (See :es:Capitalidad de Valladolid.) Cervantes' House was part of the wave of construction that filled the demand created by the sudden growth in population the Corte's relocation provoked. That is to say, it was a new or nearly-new house.

There is good information on Cervantes' Valladolid house, where he was living in 1605. By chance, a prominent nobleman was murdered in the street in front of Cervantes' house. The body of the dying man was taken to the lower floor of the house Cervantes lived in, where he expired. The ensuing investigation involved depositions from everyone in the house at the time.

From this documentation, thoroughly studied by :es:Luis Astrana Marín, we know that instead of occupying the three houses joined to create the museum, his mother lived in one room and the rest of his household in another, above a tavern on the ground floor. 
Only women were living with him: his wife Catalina, his very religious ("beata") sister Magdalena, a seamstress for wealthy gentlemen, his sister Andrea, also a seamstress, her illegitimate daughter Costanza, Cervantes' illegitimate daughter Isabel, and a maid named María. It is well documented in the testimony that prostitutes were associated with the house, but the identity of the prostitutes has never been clarified. There were suspicions that among them may have been some of the women in Cervantes' household, who were the only single adult wonen living in the building.

The building has been designated with the heritage listing Bien de Interés Cultural (Property of Cultural Value), and has been protected since 9 June 1958.

Gallery

References

Bibliography
 Juan Agapito y Revilla, Boletín de la Sociedad castellana de excursiones (1905–1906), tomo II.
 Juan Agapito y Revilla, Las calles de Valladolid, Valladolid, Imprenta Casa Martín, 1937.
 N. Sanz y Ruiz de la Peña, La casa de Cervantes en Valladolid, Fundaciones Vega-Inclán, 1972.
 Javier Salazar Rincón, El escritor y su entorno. Cervantes y la corte de Valladolid en 1605, Valladolid, Junta de Castilla y León, 2006.
 Macarena Márquez, Lo que Cervantes me contó de su casa de Valladolid, Jeromín 12º, Valladolid, Servicios de Publicaciones del Ayuntamiento, 2012.

External links
 Museo Casa de Cervantes website
Virtual tour of the Casa de Cervantes provided by Google Arts & Culture

Bien de Interés Cultural landmarks in Castile and León
Cervantes
Historic house museums in Spain
Museums in Valladolid
Miguel de Cervantes